Alexander August Wyatt (born 3 June 1976) is an Australian former first-class cricketer.

Wyatt was born at Melbourne in June 1976. He later studied at the University of Melbourne, before studying in England as a Rhodes Scholar at New College, Oxford. While studying at Oxford, he played first-class cricket, making a single appearance for Oxford UCCE against Northamptonshire at Oxford in 2002, in addition to making two first-class appearances for Oxford University against Cambridge University in The University Matches of 2002 and 2004. He took four wickets in his three matches with his leg break bowling, taking three for Oxford University and one for Oxford MCCU. 

In 2018, he founded the startup robotics company August Robotics, based in the Chinese city of Shenzhen.

Notes and references

External links

1976 births
Living people
Cricketers from Melbourne
Australian Rhodes Scholars
Alumni of New College, Oxford
Australian cricketers
Oxford MCCU cricketers
Oxford University cricketers
Australian businesspeople
Australian expatriates in China
University of Melbourne alumni sportspeople